Praxis is a live album by Cecil Taylor recorded in Italy in July 1968 and released on the Greek Praxis label as a double LP. It features the first solo piano performance released by Taylor but has yet to be released on CD.

Track listing
All compositions by Cecil Taylor.
 "Praxis, Part I" - 18:37
 "Praxis, Part II" - 19:14
 "Praxis, Part III" - 19:15
 "Praxis, Part IV" - 19:00
Recorded in Italy in July 1968

Personnel
Cecil Taylor – piano

References

1968 live albums
Cecil Taylor live albums
Solo piano jazz albums